Provincial Forest Service, often abbreviated to as PFS, is one of the state natural resource services under Group 'A' state service of Government of Uttar Pradesh responsible for ensuring the ecological stability of the country via thorough protection and participatory sustainable forestry, wildlife and environment. It is also the feeder service for Indian Forest Service in the state.

The Department of Forest and Wildlife of the Government of Uttar Pradesh is the cadre-controlling authority of the service. Along with the two state civil services which are Provincial Civil Service (PCS) and the Provincial Police Service (PPS), the PFS being a state natural resource service is one of the three feeder services to its respective All India Services.

Recruitment 
In theory, one-third of the PFS quota is filled by promotion from Forest Rangers' cadre, and the remainder of recruitment is done on the basis of an annual competitive examination conducted by Uttar Pradesh Public Service Commission, but in reality, there hasn't been an examination held for ACF in many years. PFS officers, regardless of their mode of entry, are appointed by the Governor of Uttar Pradesh.

Responsibilities of PFS officer 
The typical functions performed by a PFS officer are:
 Conservation of precious forest resources while understanding the larger policies of the government to protect and preserve the heritage of the forest and its resources.

Career progression 
After completing their training, a PFS officer generally serves as assistant conservator of forests and are posted as sub-divisional forest officer. After that they are promoted as deputy conservator of Forests, divisional forest officer, deputy director in forest department.

Salary structure 
Most of the directly recruited PFS officers get promoted to the IFS after getting pay level 11.

See also 
 Provincial Finance and Accounts Service (Uttar Pradesh)
 Provincial Rural Development Service (Uttar Pradesh)
 Provincial Secretariat Service (Uttar Pradesh)
 Provincial Transport Service (Uttar Pradesh)

References

External links 

Civil Services of Uttar Pradesh
1966 establishments in Uttar Pradesh